The Sebastian River Area Chamber of Commerce is a Chamber of Commerce located in Florida. It was incorporated in February 1958, and was established to promote the civic, economic and social welfare of the people in the Sebastian River Area. The Chamber serves the communities in Wabasso, Fellsmere, Grant, Micco, Little Hollywood, and Sebastian, including all of the unincorporated areas of North Indian River County and South Brevard County. The Chamber is a volunteer-driven organization and its mission statement is to be a proactive, member-supported association of businesses, organizations and individuals, united in their effort to support a healthy business environment, promote business development, encourage growth of tourism and to use its collective strength to enhance the quality of life in the community.

The Chamber is located in the heart of Sebastian at 700 Main St, on the southeast corner of U.S. One and Main, overlooking the Indian River Lagoon and the Main St. Boat Ramp and dock.

The SRA Chamber Visitor's Center and Information Office welcomes over seven thousand tourists and visitors every year, providing information on recreation, eco-tourism activities, the county's natural resources, referrals to its business members, calendars of events, etc.

References

External links
 Official website

Indian River County, Florida
Brevard County, Florida
Chambers of commerce in the United States